Juan Manuel Zúñiga (June 24, 1963 – March 18, 2007) was a Mexican professional wrestler, or Luchador as they are called in Spanish, best known for working under the ring name Ángel Azteca (Aztec Angel) since the late 1980s. Zúñiga is not related to wrestlers "Ángel Azteca, Jr." and "Ángel Azteca II", instead they paid Zúñiga to use the name and image. As Ángel Azteca Zúñiga worked as an enmascarado, or masked wrestler, until losing a match against Arkangel de la Muerte in 2003 where he was forced to unmask.

Zúñiga died of a heart attack on March 18, 2007, only a few hours after wrestling in the main event of a local promotion.

Professional wrestling career
Juan Zúñiga trained under Héctor López, Asterión and Lucha Libre superstar Dr. Wagner before making his professional wrestling debut in 1980. Initially he worked as "Charro" or "Charro de Jalisco", winning the Mexican National Cruiserweight Championship On October 24, 1986, from Adorable Rubí. On December 28, 1986, he lost the title to wrestler "Judas". In 1988, he changed his ring persona, creating the "Ángel Azteca" (Aztec Angel) character that he would be most known as for the remainder of his career as he began working full-time for Empresa Mexicana de Lucha Libre (EMLL; later renamed to Consejo Mundial de Lucha Libre (CMLL)).

Ángel Azteca was teamed up with fellow técnico (a good guy character or Face) Atlantis to form a very successful tag team. Together they won the Mexican National Tag Team Championship on March 6, 1988, from the team of Los Infernales (Masakre and MS-1). Over the next 811 days, Azteca and Atlantis defended the tag team titles against such teams as Hombre Bala and Pirata Morgan, El Dandy and El Texano and Pierroth, Jr. and Ulisses. On February 26, 1989 Ángel Azteca became a double champion when he defeated Bestia Salvaje for the Mexican National Welterweight Championship. Two months later, Azteca vacated the Mexican National Welterweight Championship when he defeated Emilio Charles, Jr. to win the NWA World Middleweight Championship, moving up to the Middleweight division.

Azteca would make several successful defenses against the former champion as well as El Hijo del Gladiador. On May 25, 1990, Atlantis and Ángel Azteca were finally beaten for the Mexican Tag title by Pierroth, Jr. and Bestia Salvaje. A couple of months later El Dandy won the NWA World Middleweight Championship from Ángel Azteca. The loss of the Tag Team titles was used as the storyline motivation for Ángel Azteca turning rudo (villain or heel after attacking his partner. The feud between the two continued off and on until Ángel Azteca's death in 2007, while the two remained close friends backstage. On March 9, 1991 Ángel Azteca and Volador teamed up to win the Mexican National Tag Team Championship from Pierroth, Jr. and Bestia Salvaje, holding them for two months before dropping them to Los Destructores (Tony Arce and Vulcano). In 1992 Ángel Azteca left CMLL and joined a large number of ex-CMLL employees in the newly created Asistencia Asesoría y Administración (AAA) promotion. In AAA Ángel Azteca teamed up with El Hijo del Santo and Super Muñeco to win the Mexican National Trios Championship from Los Payasos (Coco Amarillo, Coco Azul and Coco Rojo). The trio held the championship for 124 days before losing it back to Los Payasos.

After losing the Trios title, Ángel Azteca briefly worked for AAA as "Charro de Jalisco", but left AAA not long after. When he returned to CMLL the creative team was planning on giving Ángel Azteca a new mask and outfit to "freshen up" the character, but when Azteca temporarily retired from wrestling, the new mask design and tights was given to a new CMLL wrestler dubbed Último Guerrero. Zúñiga only worked in a very limited capacity from the mid-1990s until early 2003 where he returned to CMLL. Azteca began working a low card feud with Arkangel de la Muerte that received limited publicity until CMLL began hyping their 70th Anniversary show, where Ángel Azteca versus Arkangel de la Muerte was booked in a Luchas de Apuestas match where the loser would have to unmask. Arkangel won, unmasking Ázteca in what was Ángel Azteca's last high publicity match. After the mask loss Ángel Azteca left CMLL, working a limited scheduled on the independent circuit, sometimes even working as a referee instead of a wrestler.

In 2006 Ángel Azteca returned to the ring, mainly to help push "Ángel Azteca II" and "Ángel Azteca, Jr."; two wrestlers who paid Zúñiga to use the "Ángel Azteca" name. After Zúñiga's death Ángel Azteca II changed his name to Emperador Azteca while Ángel Azteca, Jr. still uses the name in CMLL, but does not make any claims about being the son of Ángel Azteca.

Personal life
Juan Zúñiga was married and the couple had five children together. Zúñiga had a reputation of being a gentleman both inside and outside of the ring and was very respected by his peers.

Death
On March 13, 2007, Zúñiga teamed up with Demonio Rojo and Pinkusky as they lost a match to Atlantis, Imperio Dorado and Rebelde Punk in the main event of a local Campeche show. After the match Zúñiga signed autographs for the fans, but then began complaining of chest pains in the locker room. The event doctor immediately took him to the Manuel Campos Hospital but Zúñiga died shortly after arriving. The autopsy revealed that Zúñiga had died from a heart attack. The body was later taken to Mexico City for the wake before being transferred to Zúñiga's home town of Torreón, Coahuila where he was buried.

Championships and accomplishments
Asistencia Asesoría y Administración
Mexican National Trios Championship (1 time) – with El Hijo del Santo and Super Muñeco
Empresa Mexicana de Lucha Libre / Consejo Mundial de Lucha Libre
Mexican National Cruiserweight Championship (1 time) – as "Charro de Jalisco"
Mexican National Tag Team Championship (2 times) – with Atlantis, Super Parka
Mexican National Welterweight Championship (1 time)
NWA World Middleweight Championship (1 time)
Local Mexican promotions
Laguna Lightweight Championship (1 time)
Arena Victoria Tag Team Championship (1 time)

Luchas de Apuestas record

See also
 List of premature professional wrestling deaths

Footnotes

References

1963 births
2007 deaths
20th-century professional wrestlers
21st-century professional wrestlers
Masked wrestlers
Mexican male professional wrestlers
Professional wrestlers from Durango
People from Gómez Palacio, Durango
Mexican National Tag Team Champions
Mexican National Trios Champions
NWA World Middleweight Champions